Wash up may refer to:

Dishwashing, the cleaning of eating and cooking utensils
Wash-up period, the period immediately before Parliament is dissolved, when outstanding Parliamentary business is concluded